Oleg Hromțov (born 30 May 1983) is a footballer who plays as a midfielder. He has played for clubs in Moldova, Ukraine, Russia, Belarus, Kazakhstan, Armenia and Azerbaijan.

Club career
Hromțov began playing football with Moldovan side CS Tiligul-Tiras Tiraspol. In 2004, he would move abroad to play in the Ukrainian Premier League for FC Borysfen Boryspil. He spent the next several seasons as a journeyman, playing in the Russian First Division for FC Khimki, Belarusian Premier League for FC Dinamo Minsk, Ukrainian First League with FC Dnipro Cherkasy and FC Volyn Lutsk, Kazakhstan Premier League with FC Kaisar, Armenian Premier League with FC Banants and Azerbaijan Premier League with PFC Turan Tovuz.

In 2020, Hromțov returned to FC Akzhayik.

References

External links
 
 
 

1983 births
Living people
Moldovan footballers
Association football forwards
Moldovan expatriate footballers
Moldovan expatriate sportspeople in Russia
Moldovan expatriate sportspeople in Belarus
Moldovan expatriate sportspeople in Kazakhstan
Moldovan expatriate sportspeople in Armenia
Moldovan expatriate sportspeople in Azerbaijan
Moldovan expatriate sportspeople in Ukraine
Expatriate footballers in Russia
Expatriate footballers in Belarus
Expatriate footballers in Kazakhstan
Expatriate footballers in Armenia
Expatriate footballers in Azerbaijan
Expatriate footballers in Ukraine
CS Tiligul-Tiras Tiraspol players
FC Borysfen Boryspil players
FC Khimki players
FC Spartak Vladikavkaz players
FC Dinamo Minsk players
FC Dnipro Cherkasy players
FC Volyn Lutsk players
FC Kaisar players
FC Urartu players
Turan-Tovuz IK players
FC Akzhayik players
FC Zhenis Astana players
FC Caspiy players
FC Taraz players
FC Zhetysu players
Moldova under-21 international footballers
Moldova international footballers